The Taiwan long-eared bat (Plecotus taivanus), also known as the Taiwan big-eared bat, is a species of vesper bat in the family Vespertilionidae. It is found only in Taiwan. The Taiwan big-eared bat was described as a new species in 1991 by M. Yoshiyuki.

References

Mammals of Taiwan
Endemic fauna of Taiwan
Taxonomy articles created by Polbot
Mammals described in 1991
Bats of Asia
Taiwan big-eared bat